Mikel Artetxe Guezuraga (born 24 September 1976) is a Spanish former road bicycle racer, who rode professionally between 1999 and 2007 for the , 3 Molinos Resort and  teams.

Career 

At the start of the 2006 season, Artetxe moved a division down to the newly formed 3 Molinos Resort team. Here he had the biggest wins of his career, with a stage win in the Vuelta a Asturias and the sprints classification in the Troféu Joaquim Agostinho. With the rapid demise of 3 Molinos Resort, Artetxe moved to the newly formed  team for 2007.

External links 
 
 Palmarès

1976 births
Living people
People from Greater Bilbao
Cyclists from the Basque Country (autonomous community)
Spanish male cyclists
Sportspeople from Biscay